A number of different units of measurement were historically used in Cyprus to measure quantities like length, mass, area and capacity.  Before the Metric system, the Imperial system was used.  In between 1986-1988, metric system was adopted in Cyprus.

Units used alongside the Imperial system

A number of units were used alongside the Imperial system.

Length

One pic was equal to 2 feet (0.6096 m). Prior to the adoption of the metric system for units of length in 1986, this was the base unit for length. Other units used were the following:

1 inch = 2.54 cm or  foot,  pic, or  yard 

1 foot = 30.48 cm or 12 inches,  pic, or  yard

1 yard = 0.9144 m or 3 feet, or  pics

1 chain = 20.1168 m or 66 feet, 33 pics, or 22 yards

1 mile = 1.609344 km or 5280 feet, 2640 pics, 1760 yards, or 80 chains

Area

One donum was equal to 1337.803776 m2 and was divided into 4 evleks, each of them covering 3600 sq. feet or 400 sq. yards; in Imperial units, a donum is equivalent to  acre. The Greek name for donum is σκάλα. Prior to the adoption of the metric system for units of area in 1986, this was the base unit for area. Other units used were the following:

1 square inch = 6.4516 cm2 or  sq. feet

1 square foot = 0.09290304 m2 or  sq. yards, or 144 sq. inches

1 square yard = 0.83612736 m2 or  evleks,  donums, or 9 square feet

1 evlek = 334.450944 m2 or  donum, 400 square yards, or 3600 square feet

1 square mile = 2.589988110336 km2 or 640 acres, or 1936 donums

Mass

One oke was equal to exactly 2.8 pounds avoirdupois (1.270058636 kg) and was divided into 4 onjas, each of them weighing 100 drams.  Prior to the adoption of the metric system for units of mass in 1986, this was the base unit for mass. Other units used were the following: 

1 dram = 3.17514659 g or  oke; in Imperial units, it was equivalent to 49 grains

1 Cyprus litre = 2.2861055448 kg or  okes or 720 drams; in Imperial units, it was equivalent to  pounds

1 kantar = 55,882579984 kg or 44 okes, or  Cyprus litres; in Imperial units, it was equivalent to  pounds

1 Aleppo kantar (used for carobs) = 228.61055448 kg or 180 okes, 100 Cyprus litres, or  kantar; in Imperial units, it was equivalent to 504 pounds

1 ton = 1016,0469088 kg or 800 okes,  Cyprus litres,  kantars, or  Aleppo kantars; in Imperial units, it is equivalent to 20 long cwt or 2240 pounds

Capacity

One kilé was equal to 1 Imperial bushel or 8 gallons, i.e. 36.368735032 L. Prior to the adoption of the metric system for units of capacity in 1986 (1988 for milk), this was the base unit for capacity  Other units used (for dry and liquid measures) were the following:

1 pint = 568.261484875 mL or 20 fluid ounces

1 quart = 1.13652296975 L or 2 pints, or  Cyprus litres

1 Cyprus oke = 1.27290572612 L or  Cyprus litres

1 Cyprus litre = 3.1822643153 L or  Cyprus okes, or  quarts

1 gallon = 4.546091879 L or 4 quarts, or 8 pints
(The legal definition of the gallon and derived units in Cyprus was not the same as in the UK; in fact, the 1965 definition was used.)

1 kartos = 5.09162290448 L or 4 Cyprus okes, 1.6 Cyprus litres, or  gallons

With regard to liquid measures, the following units were also used:

1 kouza = 10.22870672775 L or  gallons, 9 quarts or 18 pints

1 gomari or load = 163.659307644 L or 16 kouzas, 36 gallons, 144 quarts, or 288 pints (used for grain too).

References

Cypriot culture
Cyprus